The Communists' Unity Board (in Spanish: Mesa para la Unidad de los Comunistas) was an electoral coalition in Spain formed to contest the 1986 general election, composed primarily by Santiago Carrillo's split party, the Workers' Party of Spain–Communist Unity.

References

1986 establishments in Spain
Defunct communist parties in Spain
Defunct political party alliances in Spain
Political parties established in 1986